Siaran-e Nahrab (also Romanized as Sīārān-e Nahrāb) is a village in Bazan Rural District, in the Central District of Javanrud County, Kermanshah Province, Iran. At the 2006 census, its population was 173, in 37 families.

References 

Populated places in Javanrud County